Marcus Zegarowski (born August 3, 1998) is an American professional basketball player for the Austin Spurs of the NBA G League. He played college basketball for the Creighton Bluejays.

High school career
Zegarowski attended Hamilton-Wenham, where as a freshman he averaged 20 points per game. Alongside twin brother Max, Marcus led the team to an undefeated season and the school's first-ever Division 4 state basketball championship. Both Zegarowskis transferred to Tilton School in New Hampshire for their sophomore season. Marcus averaged 23 points, five rebounds, and six assists per game as a junior and had a season-high 37 points against Proctor Academy. He led the team to the Class AA championship game before losing to Cushing Academy, and he was named to the All-NEPSAC AA first team. As a senior, Zegarowski was named NEPSAC AA player of the year and scored a career-high 57 points in a 118–116 double overtime win over the South Kent School. He scored 24 points in a 99–92 win over St. Andrew's School as Tilton won the Class AA championship. Zegarowski committed to playing college basketball for Creighton over offers from Ohio State, Minnesota, and Washington.

College career
On February 3, 2019, Zegarowski fractured his hand and missed three games. As a freshman, Zegarowski became Creighton's starting point guard and averaged 10.4 points, 3.4 assists, and 3.2 rebounds per game. He was named to the Big East All-Freshman Team. Zegarowski had an offseason hip injury that forced him to miss the team's exhibition trip to Australia. Zegarowski scored a career-high 32 points and had five assists and two steals on November 30, in a 83–76 overtime win over Texas Tech. On February 23, 2020, he made all seven three-point attempts en route to 25 points in an 81–59 win over Butler. On March 7, Zegarowski suffered a right knee injury during the game against Seton Hall, but still managed to post 23 points, six rebounds, and five assists in the win. He underwent arthroscopic surgery after the game, ending his season. Zegarowski averaged 16.1 points and 5 rebounds per game as a sophomore, shooting 42.4 percent from three-point range. He was named to the Second Team All-Big East and Second Team All-American by NBC Sports.

Coming into his junior season, Zegarowski was named Preseason Big East Player of the Year. He averaged 15.8 points, 4.3 assists, 3.6 rebounds and 1.3 steals per game and led the Big East with 80 three-pointers. Zegarowski was named to the First Team All-Big East and led the Bluejays to the Sweet 16 of the NCAA Tournament before falling to Gonzaga. On April 13, 2021, he declared for the 2021 NBA draft, forgoing his remaining college eligibility.

Professional career

Long Island Nets (2021–2022)
Zegarowski was selected in the second round of the 2021 NBA draft with the 49th pick by the Brooklyn Nets. Zegarowski was later included in the roster of the Brooklyn Nets for the 2021 NBA Summer League. On October 25, 2021, Zegarowski was included in the training camp roster of the Long Island Nets. On March 18, 2022, the Long Island Nets waived Zegarowski. On September 25, 2022, the Brooklyn Nets signed Zegarowski to an Exhibit 10 deal.  On November 4, 2022, Zegarowski was named to the opening night roster for the Long Island Nets.

Windy City Bulls (2022)
On November 12, 2022, Zegarowski was traded to the Windy City Bulls in exchange for Vrenz Bleijenbergh.

Austin Spurs (2022–present)
On December 22, 2022, Zegarowski was traded from the Windy City Bulls to the Austin Spurs.

Career statistics

College

|-
| style="text-align:left;"| 2018–19
| style="text-align:left;"| Creighton
| 32 || 16 || 28.6 || .453 || .426 || .769 || 3.2 || 3.4 || .9 || .0 || 10.4
|-
| style="text-align:left;"| 2019–20
| style="text-align:left;"| Creighton
| 31 || 30 || 34.6 || .488 || .424 || .763 || 3.8 || 5.0 || 1.1 || .1 || 16.1
|-
| style="text-align:left;"| 2020–21
| style="text-align:left;"| Creighton
| 29 || 29 || 33.6 || .464 || .421 || .786 || 3.6 || 4.3 || 1.3 || .1 || 15.8
|- class="sortbottom"
| style="text-align:center;" colspan="2"| Career
| 92 || 75 || 32.2 || .471 || .423 || .772 || 3.5 || 4.2 || 1.1 || .1 || 14.1

Personal life
Zegarowski's older half-brother, Michael Carter-Williams, plays in the National Basketball Association (NBA) and was named NBA Rookie of the Year in 2014. His older sister, Masey, plays NCAA Division I basketball for Bryant. Zegarowski has a twin brother, Max, who also plays Division I basketball for Stonehill College. Both his parents, Zach and Amanda, played basketball in high school, and Amanda is a basketball coach.

References

External links
Creighton Bluejays bio

1998 births
Living people
American men's basketball players
Basketball players from Massachusetts
Brooklyn Nets draft picks
Creighton Bluejays men's basketball players
Long Island Nets players
People from Hamilton, Massachusetts
Point guards
Sportspeople from Essex County, Massachusetts